Proton myo-inositol cotransporter, also known as solute carrier family 2 member 13 is a protein that in humans is encoded by the SLC2A13 gene.

References

Further reading 
 
 
 
 
 
 

Solute carrier family